Lucy Anderson (born 18 May 1991) is a New Zealand rugby union player.

Biography 
Anderson injured her right knee skiing in 2007 and had to have a full reconstruction of her ACL joint. In 2012, she had cartilage taken out of her right knee and her left knee also had a full ACL reconstruction because of a rugby injury.

Anderson was named in the Matatū squad for the inaugural 2022 Super Rugby Aupiki season. She was selected for the Black Ferns squad for the 2022 Pacific Four Series.

Anderson made her international test debut on 18 June 2022 against the United States at Whangārei.

References

External links 
 Black Ferns Profile

1991 births
Living people
New Zealand female rugby union players
New Zealand women's international rugby union players
Rugby union props